George William Andrew (5 October 1917 – 26 December 1987) was an Australian rules footballer who played with St Kilda in the Victorian Football League (VFL).

He was a nephew of another footballer, Bruce Andrew.

In 1950, George Andrew, along with Ron Casey, became part of 3DB's original football commentary team. He left 3DB in 1956 and joined 3UZ's sale team.

Notes

External links 

1917 births
1987 deaths
Australian rules footballers from Melbourne
St Kilda Football Club players
People from Northcote, Victoria